A cricket team from England organised by the Marylebone Cricket Club (MCC) toured India from 15 December 1933 to 4 March 1934. In the Test matches, the side was known as "England"; in other matches, it was known as "MCC". England won the Test series 2–0. The MCC team concluded its tour with four matches in Ceylon, two of them first-class.

Test matches

1st Test

2nd Test

3rd Test

References

External links
 MCC in India and Ceylon 1933-34 at CricketArchive
 Tour page CricInfo
 Record CricInfo

Further reading
Ramachandra Guha, A Corner of a Foreign Field, Picador, London, 2002, pp. 199–221

1933-34
1933 in Indian cricket
1934 in Indian cricket
1933 in English cricket
1934 in English cricket
1934 in Ceylon
English cricket tours of Sri Lanka
International cricket competitions from 1918–19 to 1945
Indian cricket seasons from 1918–19 to 1944–45
Sri Lankan cricket seasons from 1880–81 to 1971–72